is a 2015 Japanese black-and-white romantic comedy-drama film directed by . It was released on July 25, 2015.

Plot

Cast
Kiyohiko Shibukawa
Ken Mitsuishi

Makiko Watanabe

Reception
On The Japan Times, Mark Schilling called the film "one director’s attempt to portray his real life through a fictional self".

At the 37th Yokohama Film Festival, the film was chosen as the 9th best Japanese film of 2015.  won the award for Best Screenplay, Kiyohiko Shibukawa won the award for Best Actor, Ken Mitsuishi won the award for Best Supporting Actor and Aoba Kawai won the award for Best Supporting Actress.

References

External links
 

2010s Japanese films
2015 romantic comedy-drama films
Japanese black-and-white films
Japanese romantic comedy-drama films
2015 comedy films
2015 drama films
2015 films